Ridgeriders is a 1999 studio album based on music from the TV series Ridge Riders. The album is a collaboration album between Phil Beer, Ashley Hutchings and Chris While. It also guest features The Albion Band and Julie Matthews.

The musicians later toured much of the album in January 2001, with one concert subsequently released as "Ridgeriders" In Concert in November 2001.

The album is a concept album, as it is a "journey" album that would be played on a journey around Southern England, making it similar to another of Beer's albums, Show of Hands' The Path.

Similar to Beer's older album The Works, the album's release is of question. Whilst the TV series began in 1994, the album was released in September 1999, and mostly recorded the same year in Preston and Southport. The album was re-released in June 2001 by Talking Elephant, who would release the aforementioned live album later that year.

"Close Your Eyes" was actually recorded in 1995, and appeared on The Albion Band's album Albion Heart that year.

Critical reception

In their positive review, Living Tradition said the album is an "interesting concept album with enough interest for those who never saw the series, but for those readers north of the Border, it is very English in feel."

Album track listing
"Shapes of the Landscape" - 2:22
"The Work of the Devil" - 2:10
"Along the Downs" - 2:29
"The Drover's Song" - 2:03
"Turnpike Reel" - 2:24
"Close Your Eyes" - 3:11
"Low Southern Slopes" - 1:54
"What Celia Sees" - 2:43
"Never Without a Thief or Twain" - 2:12
"Along the Pilgrim's Way" - 3:58
"Michael Morey's Hump" - 1:58
"Mossing We'll Go" - 2:43
"Up on the Ridgeway" - 2:24
"Smuggler's Road" - 2:58
"Betteshanger Treasure" - 2:39
"Dorset Cursus" - 3:41

Personnel
Phil Beer - vocals, acoustic guitar, slide guitar, mandocello, fiddle, mandolin
Chris While - vocals, acoustic guitar
Ashley Hutchings - vocals, acoustic bass, electric bass
with
Joe Broughton - fiddle, mandolin
Neil Marshall - drums, percussion
Julie Matthews - keyboards, backing vocals
Ken Nicol - acoustic guitar, electric guitar, backing vocals
Simon Nicol - acoustic guitar on "Close Your Eyes"
Technical
Engineered by Ken Nicol except for tracks 1, 3, 10 & 12, engineered and mixed by Julie Matthews
Executive producer: Ashley Hutchings
Mastered by Andy Seward
Photography by Jeff Wright

"Ridgeriders" In Concert

"Ridgeriders" In Concert is a live album released in 2001. It was the first album by Phil Beer to be released on the Talking Elephant label.

Track listing
"Shapes of the Landscape" - 2:37
"Row of Pines" - 3:47
"The Cursus of Bignor" - 2:00
"Mossing We'll Go" - 3:05
"Tan Hill Fair" - 4:11
"All Seing Stour" - 3:42
"What Celia Sees" - 3:26
"Rosa" - 3:12
"I Am a Humble Bridge" - 3:28
"Close Your Eyes" - 2:54
"Robber's Roost" - 3:23
"Smuggler's Road" - 2:21
"Michael Morey's Hump" - 2:22
"To Be a Pilgrim" - 3:02
"Along the Pilgrim's Way" - 3:43
"Up the Crooked Spire/GeneralWard" - 5:09
"Ill Omens" - 5:39
"High and Wild Places" - 4:31

References

1999 albums
2001 albums
1994 British television series debuts
2002 British television series endings
Television shows produced by Meridian Broadcasting
Television series by ITV Studios
English-language television shows
Phil Beer albums
Concept albums
Ashley Hutchings albums